Basiptera castaneipennis is a species of longhorn beetle in the Cerambycinae subfamily, and the only species in the genus Basiptera. It was described by Thomson in 1864. It is known from Paraguay and Argentina.

References

Cerambycinae
Beetles described in 1864